Losing It with John Stamos is an American web television talk show hosted by actor John Stamos. The show debuted on September 9, 2013.

Background
With the show, Stamos "sits down with a celebrity, who regales him with a story about turning in his or her v-card. Occasionally, bits are re-enacted by cute cartoon characters or puppets." Stamos had originally pitched the show thirteen years earlier to MTV. In its earlier incarnation, celebrities such as Rebecca Romijn, David Boreanez, and Snoop Dogg participated. That iteration of show was ultimately not ordered to series due to an inability to attract enough celebrity guests.

The show was originally announced as a part of Yahoo's 2013 Newfront comedy slate.

Future
Stamos commented that had hopes that the series could evolve outward from its web series beginnings and expressed frustrations with the time constraints imposed by Yahoo!. He discussed plans for a syndicated version of the show that would run 22 minutes.

Episodes

See also
List of original programs distributed by Yahoo! Screen

References

External links

English-language television shows
2010s American comedy television series
2013 American television series debuts